Claydes "Charles" Smith (real name Claydes Eugene Smith; September 6, 1948 – June 20, 2006) was an American musician best known as co-founder and lead guitarist of the group Kool & the Gang.

Biography
Born in Jersey City, New Jersey, he was introduced to jazz guitar by his father in the early 1960s. In the late 1960s, he joined with Ronald Bell (later Khalis Bayyan), Robert "Kool" Bell, George Brown, Dennis Thomas and Robert "Spike" Mickens to become Kool & the Gang.  His cool jazz stylings and octave runs, reminiscent of Wes Montgomery but uniquely his own, enriched the music of the group.  His playing on the hit "Summer Madness" is a fine example of his work.

Kool & the Gang blended jazz, funk, R&B, and pop. The group remained popular from the 1960s through the 1980s.

Smith stopped touring in January 2006 due to illness.

Smith's family included six children: Claydes A. Smith, Justin Smith, Aaron Corbin, August Williams, Uranus Smith-Garay, and Tyteen Humes. He died in Maplewood, New Jersey, and is buried in Westfield, New Jersey's Fairview Cemetery.

References

External links

1948 births
2006 deaths
American funk guitarists
American male guitarists
Musicians from Jersey City, New Jersey
Kool & the Gang members
African-American guitarists
20th-century American musicians
Guitarists from New Jersey
20th-century American guitarists
20th-century American male musicians

de:Claydes Charles Smith